Tomasz Szukalski, born December 25, 1947, in Warsaw, Polish People's Republic, registered by Soviet authorities January 8, 1948 – died August 2, 2012, in Piaseczno, Poland,  was a Polish jazz saxophonist, composer and improviser. Szukalski worked with Tomasz Stańko, Edward Vesala and Zbigniew Namysłowski. Awarded Magister of Music (Master of Arts) at Fryderyk Chopin University of Music, Warsaw. Szukalski was a revered master of tenor saxophone and his style was often compared to that of John Coltrane and Ben Webster.

Life and career

Early years
Szukalski studied clarinet but preferred to perform on tenor saxophone, soprano saxophone and on special occasions on bass clarinet or baritone saxophone. Being experiment friendly, he once tried a chainsaw.

Szukalski began his career in the jazz orchestras of Zbigniew Namysłowski and Jan Ptaszyn Wróblewski. Other members of the bands included Tomasz Stańko, Zbigniew Seifert, Adam Makowicz, Włodzimierz Nahorny, Janusz Muniak, Michał Urbaniak and Tomasz's lifelong mate Wojciech Karolak.

Tomasz Stańko, ECM and SBB
In the 1970s, Szukalski's performances became more avant-garde and free. While he continued to perform with  Tomasz Stańko, he also worked with Peter Warren and Edward Vesala as well as Arild Andersen, Dave Holland, Palle Danielsson, Palle Mikkelborg, Terje Rypdal, Juhani Aaltonen and Antti Hytti. During this period, in 1975, he recorded with Stańko on the trumpeter's album entitled "Balladyna" for ECM. Parallel to touring Scandinavia and West Europe with other jazz musicians, Szukalski performed in Poland with the Silesian rockband SBB.

The Quartet and Józef Skrzek
In 1977, Szukalski consolidated his own band The Quartet, which soon gained high reputation. His bandmates were Sławomir Kulpowicz, Paweł Jarzębski and Janusz Stefański. Some of the last concerts of this famous constellation were performed according to various sources in 1979 or 1980 at Village Vanguard in New York. In the years 1980-1981 Szukalski continued a duo cooperation with SBB's leader Józef Skrzek. The planned bookings for autumn 1981 joint performance of SBB and his own The Quartet at the Jazz Jamboree festival, due to the tense political situation in Poland, were not finalized. The duo realized the album "Ambitus Extended" and Szukalski also performed with Józef Skrzek and his short living project Józef Skrzek Formation. They toured across Polish People's Republic and Czechoslovakia and performed the soundtrack for the science-fiction movie "The War of the Worlds: Next Century" (1981).

Just weeks before the onset of martial law in Poland Tomasz performed with Józef Skrzek, Andrzej Ryszka, Sławomir Piwowar, Andrzej Urny, Dean Brown and Gil Goldstein in Warsaw and with his The Quartet mates at a workshop in memory of John Coltrane "We'll Remember Coltrane" (New Jazz Meeting), organised by Joachim-Ernst Berendt at Südwestfunk in Baden-Baden, where also Tomasz Stańko, Albert Mangelsdorff and John Coltrane’s drummer Rashied Ali were present. During his stay in Vienna, following December 1981 Czechoslovakia tour (performing "Ambitus Extended" with Józef Skrzek), martial law was imposed and Szukalski returned home.

Martial law - Time killers
To survive the martial law in Poland Szukalski re-joined the orchestra of Jan Ptaszyn Wróblewski playing known American standards. In 1984, he recorded with his old mates Wojciech Karolak and Czesław Bartkowski the groovy "Time Killers", which instantly became a hit. In 1985, Tomasz consolidated his new quartet with Piotr Biskupski, Andrzej Cudzich and Andrzej Jagodziński and eventually his friend and neighbour, the drummer Marek Stach, but the new quartet did not survive due lack of performances and the atmosphere of martial law. Tomasz's custom made Henri Selmer Paris tenor saxophone and Julius Keilwerth soprano saxophone have been stolen in Warsaw a couple of months before he moved to his cabin outside Warsaw.

Artur, Alain, Antti, Apostolis, Arild
After 1990, Szukalski performed in various constellations, recorded as sideman and special guest, and started a long lasting cooperation with the young pianist Artur Dutkiewicz. 
During the last decade of the 20th century and the first of the 21st century, Tomasz performed with Artur Dutkiewicz, Wojciech Karolak, Alain Brunet (the French jazz trumpeter and vice minister of culture), Tadeusz Nalepa, Piotr Wojtasik, Wojciech Majewski, Tomasz Stańko, Palle Danielsson, Janusz Skowron, Karin Krog and Antti Hytti and again as special guest of the reunited rockband SBB. During 2007 and 2008 Szukalski with his young Polish drummer Krzysztof Dziedzic and his Norwegian friend, the bassist Arild Andersen, toured with Apostolis Anthimos as Apostolis Anthimos Quartet. At his hermitage cabin outside Warsaw Tomasz was visited by his friends and musicians inviting him to their recording sessions and performances, most often by the pianists Artur Dutkiewicz and Wojciech Majewski who always relied on "uncle Tom's" advice. Tomasz only occasionally visited Warsaw, e.g. to meet the ill Czesław Niemen just a couple of weeks before his passing away.

Death
Szukalski lost his father's home (occupied by soviet invaders), divorced and spent nearly two decades in his primitive cabin outside Warsaw, where he lived permanently since 2003. Even at his rural hermitage the soviet provocations, invigilation and robberies didn't stop and Tomasz was even visited by a policeman demanding to teach him playing a trumpet and staying at Tomasz's cabin overnight. After one such visit Tomasz's driving licence was revoked. The Quartet reunited and performed a few concerts across Europe in 2006 and 2007 but soon Sławomir Kulpowicz died. Around 2009, homeless and ill, Szukalski gained some attention from friends, especially from Artur Dutkiewicz, who organised "The Day of The Jackal" (Polish: Dzień Szakala) benefit concerts in several major Polish cities. The last and most extensive, organised in Warsaw on November 21, 2010, became the greatest jazz performance of this year in Poland, outperforming even the venerated Jazz Jamboree. The following musicians performed at the last benefit and some of them helped Tomasz find a place at an artists asylum in Skolimów outside Warsaw:

 Michał Barański - double bass
 Ewa Bem - vocal
 Danel Biel - double bass
 David Dorůžka - guitar
 Urszula Dudziak - vocal
 Artur Dutkiewicz - piano
 Tomasz Grzegorski - sax
 Krzysztof Herdzin - piano
 Borys Janczarski - sax
 Paweł Jarzębski - double bass
 Kazimierz Jonkisz - drums
 Wojciech Karolak - Hammond organ
 Tomasz Krawczyk - guitar
 Sławomir Kurkiewicz - double bass
 Robert Majewski - piano
 Adam Makowicz - piano
 Michał Miśkiewicz - drums
 Leszek Możdżer - piano
 Łukasz Poprawski - sax
 Wojciech Pulcyn - bass
 Janusz Stefański - drums
 Józef Skrzek - piano, minimoog, harmonica, vocal
 Jorgos Skolias - vocal
 Tomasz Stańko - trumpet
 Krzysztof Ścierański - bass, guitar
 Jarosław Śmietana - guitar
 Jan Smoczyński - piano
 Michał Tokaj - piano 
 Michał Urbaniak - violin
 Marcin Wasilewski - piano
 Aga Zaryan - vocal
 Łukasz Żyta - drums

After a couple of months spent at artists asylum, Szukalski died on August 2, 2012, at a hospital in Piaseczno, Poland His funeral was held on August 8, 2012, at Bródno Cemetery, just one kilometre, less than a mile, from his family's stolen and occupied home.

In 2012, Szukalski was posthumously awarded with the Medal for Merit to Culture - Gloria Artis for his achievements for the Polish culture and in 2013 with Fryderyk (in Gold), the Polish equivalent of the Grammy Award, for the works of his lifetime.

Heritage

Influence
Tomasz and Artur Dutkiewicz also sometimes offered jazz workshops for children. Tomasz was able to present his enormous wisdom, which would otherwise afford many years of education in a very condensed and simple form, which attracted many young jazz musicians consulting "uncle Tom" at every possible occasion, most often backstage after his performances or in jazz clubs, to gain some knowledge and practical advice. Tomasz also picked up and educated young jazz talents, who otherwise wouldn't be noticed and often performed as special guest promoting their debut recordings. Also aspiring singers like Anna Maria Jopek or Agnieszka Skrzypek alias Aga Zaryan profited from Tomasz's support and promotion, therefore in the Polish jazz community he was often called "uncle Tom". Szukalski was probably the youngest member of a jury of a few professional musicians, who decided about the professional qualifications needed to officially perform in the political reality of the late Polish People's Republic and therefore some, who were forced by the soviet authorities to be checked by that jury, e.g. Mateusz Pospieszalski may remember him as a strong teacher.

In popular culture
Tomasz Stańko wrote about Tomasz Szukalski in his 2010 autobiography: 

Also some of Szukalski's other friends e.g. Jarosław Śmietana, Wojciech Karolak, Krzysztof Dziedzic and others often made references to Tomasz Szukalski's impact on Polish Jazz. Their popular clip "A Story of Polish Jazz" covers all great Polish jazz musicians often referring to Szukalski.

Szukalski appears in the Polish science-fiction movie "Wojna Światów - następne stulecie" (War of the Worlds - Next Century) by Piotr Szulkin and in some jazz documentaries by Andrzej Wasylewski, e.g. "We'll Remember Coltrane" and the recent multimedia publication "Jazzowe dzieje Polaków" (Jazz History of the Poles). Although being co-composer of the "Wojna Światów - następne stulecie" (War of the Worlds - Next Century) soundtrack and even shorttly appearing in one scene, performing "Interception" from the soundtrack album (64th-67th minute of the movie), Szukalski remains uncredited in this pre-martial law production.

Szukalski's popular pseudonym Szakal (Jackal), may also refer to his playing style since the word is derived from the Persian  , which is in turn derived from the Sanskrit शृगाल śṛgāla meaning "the howler". The pseudonym used by his younger close friends was wujek Tomek (uncle Tom) or simple wujek (uncle), this is because his relations were very direct, whole-hearted and uncompromised. Some of his best friends, e.g. The Quartet musicians and two SBB technicians were able to communicate with Jackal/Uncle nonverbally - a gift very helpful during performances.

Selected discography

References

1947 births
2012 deaths
Polish jazz musicians
Polish saxophonists
20th-century saxophonists